Nattapong Khajohnmalee (born May 5, 1994), is a Thai professional footballer who plays as a goalkeeper for Sukhothai in Thai League 1.

Biography
On April 30, 2017, he had an accident. The car he sits on has collided with the end of the truck radically. He was taken to the hospital.

Later there was a world-famous footballer, such as Kurt Zouma, Olivier Giroud and Pierre-Emerick Aubameyang, to bid for a jerseys to raise funds to help him.

Honours

Club
PT Prachuap
 Thai League Cup (1): 2019

References

External links

1994 births
Living people
Nattapong Khajohnmalee
Nattapong Khajohnmalee
Association football goalkeepers
Nattapong Khajohnmalee
Nattapong Khajohnmalee